Jonathan D. Moreno is an American philosopher and historian who specializes in the intersection of bioethics, culture, science, and national security, and has published seminal works on the history, sociology and politics of biology and medicine. He is an elected member of the National Academy of Medicine.

Moreno is the David and Lyn Silfen University Professor at the University of Pennsylvania, where he is also professor of medical ethics and health policy, of history and sociology of science, and of philosophy.

Major contributions 
Called "the quietly most interesting bioethicist of our time" by The American Journal of Bioethics, Moreno has worked in bioethics in the United States and internationally. He was the co-chair of the U.S. National Academies committee that proposed the first rules governing embryonic stem cells research. As a member of the UNESCO International Bioethics Committee he participated in drafting numerous reports, including a report on bioethics and the refugee crisis. In numerous books and papers on human radiation experiments, on chemical and biological weapons and on neurotechnology he has argued that national security considerations have been key factors in the history of bioethics. He has served as senior staff member or adviser to many governmental and non-governmental organizations, including three U.S. presidential commissions, the Howard Hughes Medical Institute, and the Bill and Melinda Gates Foundation. Moreno is currently a member of the Bayer Bioethics Council. Moreno was named an official "Mad Scientist" by the U.S. Army's Training and Doctrine Command. In 2008-09 he served as a member of President Barack Obama's transition team and as the director of the Department of Health and Human Services Agency Review for Bioethics.

Early life and education
Jonathan D. Moreno was born and grew up in New York's Hudson Valley. His father, Jacob Levy Moreno, was a psychiatrist and the pioneer of psychodrama and sociometry, the precursor of social network theory. His father and mother, psychotherapist Zerka T. Moreno, worked closely together. Both of his parents emigrated to the United States from Europe before World War II. Moreno and his older sister, Regina Moreno, spent much of their childhood in Beacon, New York on the grounds of their parents' mental hospital and psychodrama training center. In Moreno's intellectual biography of his father, he recounts how growing up in that environment stimulated his interdisciplinary orientation and interest in cultures of science and social movements.

Moreno attended Hofstra University where he earned a B.A. in philosophy and psychology with highest honors in 1973. From 1973 to 1975 he was a graduate student in the philosophy doctoral program in the CUNY Graduate Center and completed his Ph.D. in philosophy at Washington University in St. Louis in 1977. Moreno's doctoral dissertation traced the development of a distinctly American semiotic tradition from Charles Sanders Peirce to Nelson Goodman. His dissertation director was Richard S. Rudner, the longtime editor of the Journal of the Philosophy of Science.

Career

Following graduation, Moreno held full-time academic appointments in philosophy at Swarthmore College, the University of Texas at Austin, and George Washington University. During 1984–85 he was an associate at the Hastings Center, the first bioethics think tank. From 1985 to 1987, he was philosopher-in-residence at the Children's National Medical Center in Washington, DC.

He was the founding director of the Program in Medical Humanities and a professor of pediatrics and medicine at the SUNY Health Science Center in Brooklyn from 1989 until 1998, when he joined the University of Virginia faculty as the Emily Davie and Joseph S. Kornfeld Professor of Biomedical Ethics and director of the Center for Biomedical Ethics.

In 2007, Moreno joined the faculty at the University of Pennsylvania as part of President Amy Gutmann's Penn Integrates Knowledge (PIK) Initiative, where he is the David and Lyn Silfen University Professor and a professor of medical ethics and health policy and of the History and Sociology of Science. He also holds a courtesy appointment in Penn's Department of Philosophy, is a member of the Center for Neuroscience and Society and the Warren Center for Network and Data Sciences. He was the interim chair of the Department of Medical Ethics and of the program in science, technology, and society in the School of Arts and Sciences.

Moreno has served as senior staff member or adviser to many governmental and non-governmental organizations on bioethics, embryonic stem cell research, national defense research, and neuroscience, including three U.S. presidential commissions, the Howard Hughes Medical Institute, and the Bill and Melinda Gates Foundation. Moreno is currently a member of the Bayer Bioethics Council. His work has been cited by Al Gore and was used in the development of the screenplay for The Bourne Legacy.

He is also a past president of the American Society for Bioethics and Humanities, and was a Fellow of the New York Academy of Medicine. A former senior fellow at the Center for American Progress, Moreno was the editor of Science Progress, an online journal focusing on progressive science and technology policy. He was co-host of Making the Call, an Endeavor Content podcast.

Academic work
Moreno has published more than a thousand papers, articles, reviews and op-eds. His writings have been translated into German, Japanese, Korean, Portuguese, Turkish and Romanian. Moreno frequently contributes to such publications as The New York Times, The Wall Street Journal, Nature, Slate, Foreign Affairs, The Hill, Axios, The Huffington Post and Psychology Today. His articles and essays extensively cover contemporary topics in bioethics, including neuroscience, reproductive technologies, embryonic stem cell research, the ethics of human experiments, national security, the politics of bioethics, and the global politics of Covid-19 vaccine development and dissemination. 

He has done original research on the creation of the Nuremberg code, the development of the Helsinki Declaration, and the history of psychedelics. Along with the historian Ulf Schmidt he has done archival work on medical ethics in the Eastern European states during the Cold War.

His recent work on neuroethics and national security includes his Defense Department-funded project on AI-enabled neurotechnologies and warfighters and on Cold War medical science under a grant from the European Research Council.

His most recent books are Everybody Wants to Go to Heaven but Nobody Wants to Die: Bioethics and the Transformation of Healthcare in America, co-authored with former Penn president Amy Gutmann, and The Brain in Context: A Pragmatic Guide to Neuroscience, written with neuroscientist Jay Schulkin. The former book was translated into Korean and published by Humanitas Publishing Co. in 2021, and the latter was translated into Japanese and published by Newton Press in 2021.

Currently he is an investigator on a $1.1 million Minerva Research Initiative project on artificial intelligence and warfighters, and senior consultant to a six-year, 10 million-euro project on cold war medical science on both sides of the iron curtain, funded by the European Research Council. He has written on the bioethical implications of the pandemic and the Ukraine war for the rules-based international order.

Awards and honors 
Describing him as "one of the world's foremost experts in bioethics and politics and bioethics in national security", the American Society for Bioethics and Humanities awarded him its 2018 Lifetime Achievement Award, the highest honor of this Society, which recognizes a "distinguished individual" for excellence in bioethics and is given in recognition for "long standing achievement in the field".

Moreno also holds an honorary doctorate from Hofstra University, and is a recipient of the College of William and Mary Law School Benjamin Rush Medal, the Dr. Jean Mayer Award for Global Citizenship from Tufts University, and the Penn Alumni Faculty Award of Merit. He has held the honorary Visiting Professorship in History at the University of Kent in Canterbury, England. His book, The Body Politic, was named as a Best Book of 2011 by Kirkus Reviews, and was a Top 26 Book in the Book Expo America, New York City in that year.

His book Mind Wars: Brain Science and the Military in the 21st Century, which covers the ethical dilemmas and bizarre history of cutting-edge technology and neuroscience developed for military applications, was referenced by the screenwriter of The Bourne Legacy to develop the screenplay.

Appearances in media 
Moreno has been interviewed by both academic institutions and the media including CBS and PBS, where he shares his latest findings, books, and insights into bioethical news. Recently, he discussed the pandemic ethics and its relation with US politics and national security with the Carnegie Council for Ethics in International Affairs.

In 2020, Dr. Moreno and Dr. Zeke Emanuel co-hosted an apple podcast program that discusses the ethical issues related to Covid-19, including vaccinations, nursing homes, abortion, and physician-assisted suicide.

In early June 2022, Moreno was invited to the Finding Founders podcast where he shared the history and ethics of neuroscience and psychedelic experiments.

Selected publications

Articles 
 "Harvard's Experiment on the Unabomber, Class of '62." Psychology Today (May 25, 2012).

Books 
 The Brain in Context: A Pragmatic Guide to Neuroscience (with J. Schulkin). New York: Columbia University Press (2020). Japanese translation: Newton Press (2021).
 Everybody Wants to Go to Heaven but Nobody Wants to Die: Bioethics and the Transformation of Health Care in America (with A. Gutmann). New York: Liveright/Norton (2019); paperback (2020). Korean translation: Humanitas Publishing Co. (2021).
 Global Bioethics: The Impact of the UNESCO International Bioethics Committee (with A. Bagheri and S. Semplici). New York: Springer (2016).
 Impromptu Man: J.L. Moreno and the Origins of Psychodrama, Encounter Culture, and the Social Network. New York: Bellevue Literary Press (2014). Portuguese translation: Brazilian Psychodrama Federation (FEBRAP) (2016). Romanian translation: Editura Hasefer (2019).
 Mind Wars: Brain Science and the Military in the 21st Century. New York: Bellevue Literary Press (2012). Revised and updated. Originally published as Mind Wars: Brain Research and National Defense. Washington, D.C.: Dana Press (2006). Japanese translation: ASCII Corporation (2008). Chinese translation: Chinese People's Military Medical Press, in press.
 Progress in Bioethics: Science, Policy and Politics (with S. Berger). Cambridge: The MIT Press (2012).
 The Body Politic: The Battle over Science in America. New York: Bellevue Literary Press (2011).
 Progress in Bioethics: Science, Policy and Politics (with S. Berger). Cambridge: The MIT Press (2010).
 Science Next: Big Ideas for the American Future (with R. Weiss). New York: Bellevue Literary Press (2009).
 Ethical Guidelines for Innovative Surgery (with A.R. Reitsma). Frederick, Md.: University Publishing Group (2006).
 Is There an Ethicist in the House? On the Cutting Edge of Bioethics. Bloomington, Indiana: Indiana University Press (2005).
 Ethical and Regulatory Aspects of Clinical Research: Readings and Commentary (with E. Emanuel, R. Crouch, J. Arras, and C. Grady). Baltimore: Johns Hopkins University Press (2003).
 National Defense and Human Research Protections (with A.E. Shamoo). New York: Taylor & Francis]] (2003).
 In the Wake of Terror: Medicine and Morality in a Time of Crisis. Cambridge: The MIT Press (2003); paperback (2004).
 Shamoo A.E. and Moreno J.D. (eds.) Business and Research: Proceedings of the Third National Conference on the Business of Human Experiments: Ethical, Legal, and Regulatory Issues. New York: Taylor & Francis (2002).
 Undue Risk: Secret State Experiments on Humans. New York: W.H. Freeman Publishers (1999); New York: Routledge (2001).
 Ethics in Clinical Practice, with J. Ahronheim and C. Zuckerman. Little, Brown and Co. (1994); 2nd ed.: Aspen Publishers (2000); paperback: Sudbury, Ma.: Jones and Bartlett Publishers (2005).
 Arguing Euthanasia: The Controversy Over Mercy Killing, Assisted Suicide and the Right to Die. New York: Simon & Schuster (1995).  Japanese translation: Mita Industries, Ltd. (1997).
 Deciding Together: Bioethics and Moral Consensus. New York: Oxford University Press (1995).
 Jacob L. Moreno: Auszuge aus der Autobiographie. Koln: InScenario (1995).
 Paying the Doctor: Health Policy and Physician Reimbursement. Dover, Mass.: Auburn House (1991).
 The Qualitative-Quantitative Distinction in the Social Sciences, Vol. 112 (with B. Glassner). Boston Studies in the Philosophy of Science. Dordrecht, Netherlands: Kluwer Academic Publishers (1989).
 The Public Humanities: An Old Role in Contemporary Perspective (with R. S. French). Washington, DC: George Washington University (1984).
 Discourse in the Social Sciences: Translating Models of Mental Illness (with B. Glassner). Westport, Conn.: Greenwood Press (1982).

References

External links
Center for American Progress: Official Page for Jonathan D. Moreno
Jonathan Moreno interviewed on Conversations from Penn State
Jonathan D. Moreno History and Sociology of Science Page
Jonathan D. Moreno Penn Center for Bioethics Official Page

Bioethicists
Living people
American people of Bulgarian-Jewish descent
American people of Dutch-Jewish descent
American people of Romanian-Jewish descent
American people of Turkish-Jewish descent
Washington University in St. Louis alumni
Swarthmore College faculty
University of Pennsylvania faculty
Center for American Progress people
Hastings Center Fellows
1952 births
Presidents of the American Society for Bioethics and Humanities
Members of the National Academy of Medicine